Jan Fischer may refer to:

 Jan Fischer (politician) (born 1951), former Prime Minister of the Czech Republic
 Jan Fischer (Czech actor) (1921–2011), Czech Jewish actor and theatre director
 Jan Fischer (rower), German rower
 Johann Bernhard Fischer von Erlach (or Jan Fischer z Erlachu, 1656–1723), Austrian architect